I Want It All is the third studio album by the American rapper Warren G. It was released on October 12, 1999, via his own label, G-Funk Entertainment, in conjunction with Restless Records. Snoop Dogg, Nate Dogg, Tha Dogg Pound, Mack 10, Eve, Jermaine Dupri, and Slick Rick make guest appearances. I Want It All contains less vocals by Warren G, who focused more on the producing.

Critical reception
Entertainment Weekly wrote that Warren G "attempts to regulate his chart position with superstar cameos; but even Snoop Dogg, Eve, and Memphis Bleek can’t bring enough edge."

AllMusic thought that "though I Want It All occasionally skirts the borders of hip-hop lite, it's chocked with quality mid-tempo productions and excellent rapping."

Track listing 
All tracks produced by Warren G, except track 8 produced by Soopafly and tracks 10 & 15 produced by Vada Nobles

Charts

Certifications

References

1999 albums
Warren G albums
Albums produced by Jermaine Dupri
Albums produced by Soopafly
Albums produced by Warren G